Eisenbach is a river of Hesse, Germany. Its source is near the village of Haintchen. It flows into the Emsbach near Niederselters.

See also
List of rivers of Hesse

Rivers of Hesse
Rivers of the Taunus
Rivers of Germany